The Diocese of the Seven Provinces, originally called the Diocese of Vienne after the city of Vienna (modern Vienne), was a diocese of the later Roman Empire, under the praetorian prefecture of Gaul. It encompassed southern and western Gaul (Aquitania and Gallia Narbonensis), that is, modern France south and west of the Loire, including Provence.

The diocese comprised the following provinces: Aquitanica I, Aquitanica II, Novempopulana (Aquitanica III), Narbonensis I, Narbonensis II, Viennensis and Alpes Maritimae.

History 
The diocese was established during the reforms of Diocletian who reigned from 284-305. It is attested early in the reign of Constantine I in the Verona List which has been dated to around 314. In 402 an annual provincial assembly, the Concilium septem provinciarum, was established in Arles. 

In 407, the Vandals and their allies invaded Gaul, devastating the region until they departed for the Iberian peninsula in 409. The Visigoths were brought in as foederati to aid the Romans against them, and in 418 emperor Honorius allowed them to settle in Aquitania around Toulouse. Although nominally Roman subjects, the Goths were practically independent, a fact which was formally recognized by the Western Empire in 475, just one year before its end. 

In 462 Ricimer ceded them also the province of Narbonensis Prima, while the Goths proceeded to occupy the remaining provinces east of the Rhone in 477. Henceforth, the lands that had comprised the diocese of the Seven Provinces became part of the Visigothic Kingdom. Aquitania was soon lost to the Franks, with only the southern coastal strip (Septimania) retained by the Goths.

See also 
 List of Late Roman provinces
 Ancient ecclesiastic diocese of Vienne
 Aquitania
 Gallia Narbonensis

Sources 
  Heather, La caduta dell'Impero romano. Una nuova storia, 2006.
 Halsall, Barbarian migrations in the roman West, 376-568, 2007.

History of Aquitaine
Septem
4th century in Roman Gaul
5th century in sub-Roman Gaul
Praetorian prefecture of Gaul
314 establishments
States and territories established in the 310s
470s disestablishments
States and territories disestablished in the 5th century
Gallia Narbonensis